Ingeborg J. Hochmair-Desoyer (born 1953) is an Austrian electrical engineer and the CEO and CTO of hearing implant company MED-EL. Dr Hochmair and her husband Prof. Erwin Hochmair co-created the first micro-electronic multi-channel cochlear implant in the world.  She received the Lasker-DeBakey Clinical Medical Research Award for her contributions towards the development of the modern cochlear implant. She also received the 2015 Russ Prize for bioengineering.

In 1989, she co-founded the medical device company MED-EL.

Biography
Ingeborg Hochmair was born in 1953 in Vienna, Austria. Her mother was a physicist and her father was Dean of the Faculty of Mechanical Engineering at Vienna University of Technology. Her grandmother was one of the first female chemical engineers in Austria.

She commenced her studies at Technical University of Vienna in electrical engineering in 1971, and in 1975, she became the first woman in Austria to receive a PhD in electrical engineering. Her dissertation was on the "Technical realization and psychoacoustic evaluation of a system for multichannel chronic stimulation of the auditory nerve."

From 1976 to 1986, she worked as Assistant Professor at the Institute of General Electrical Engineering and Electronics at Technical University of Vienna. She also worked at Stanford University's Institute for Electronics in Medicine as a Visiting Associate Professor in 1979. In 1986, she moved from Vienna to Innsbruck, where she taught (first as Assistant Professor and later as Associate Professor) at the Institute of Applied Physics Electronics of University of Innsbruck until 1989. In 1998 she achieved Venia Legendi (Univ. Doz.) in Biomedical Engineering at the Faculty of Electrical Engineering of Technical University of Vienna.

In 1989, Hochmair co-founded the hearing implant company MED-EL, along with husband Erwin Hochmair. She remains CEO and CTO of the company.

Outside of MED-EL, Hochmair continues to support research in the field of science and technology. In 2012, an endowed professorship in microelectronics and implantable systems was introduced at the University of Innsbruck’s Institute for Mechatronics, supported by Hochmair. The University of Innsbruck also offers Ingeborg Hochmair Professorships, an endowed professorship aimed at supporting female researchers in science and technology.

Research & Other Work
In 1975, Ingeborg and Erwin Hochmair started the cochlear implant development at Technical University of Vienna with the overall goal of enabling the user not only to hear sounds but also to provide some speech understanding. Together they developed the world's first microelectronic multi-channel cochlear implant. This implant included a long, flexible electrode, which could, for the first time, deliver electric signals to the auditory nerve along a large part of the cochlea, the snail-shaped inner ear. Previous cochlear implant designs provided single-channel stimulation.  The new multi-channel device was implanted in December 1977 in Vienna by Dr Kurt Burian.

In 1979, a modified version of this first device allowed a woman to understand words and sentences without lip-reading in a quiet environment via a small, body-worn sound processor. This was a major milestone in the development of modern cochlear implants. This device is the first to actually replace a human sense  Not only that, but it addresses hearing loss, which is number six on the list of the world's most significant disease burdens

Through MED-EL, Hochmair has led many further advances in hearing implant research, including the introduction of a behind-the-ear audio processor in 1991, new sound coding strategies, and the development of single-unit audio processors. A totally implantable cochlear implant is currently in development.

Hochmair has over 40 patents to her name, all of which are for components of her cochlear implant. Many of the patents were updated or improved versions of older components for which she filed a new patent. A fairly comprehensive, but incomplete, list of her patents are as follows:

1999 Structure, method of use, and method of manufacture of an implanted hearing prosthesis
1999 Device and method for implants in ossified cochleas
2003 Implantable fluid delivery apparatuses and implantable electrode
2003 Implantable device with flexible interconnect to coil
2006 Implantable fluid delivery apparatuses and implantable electrode
2006 Implantable fluid [housing] apparatuses and implantable electrode
2007 Tinnitus Suppressing Cochlear Implant
2007 Implanted system with dc free inputs and outputs
2008 Cochlear Implant Power System and Methodology
2008 Moving Coil Actuator For Middle Ear Implants
2008 Implant Sensor and Control
2009 Demagnetized Implant for Magnetic Resonance Imaging
2009 Implantable device with flexible interconnect to coil
2009 Demagnetized implant for magnetic resonance imaging
2010 Low power signal transmission
2010 Low Power Signal Transmission (part 2)
2010 Tinnitus Suppressing Cochlear Implant (updated)
2010 Moving coil actuator for middle ear implants
2010 Implantable fluid delivery apparatuses and implantable electrode (part 2)
2011 Implantable Fluid Delivery Apparatuses and Implantable Electrode (part 3)
2011 Implanted system with DC free inputs and outputs
2013 Low power signal transmission (part 3)
2013 Low power signal transmission (update 4)
2013 Implant sensor and control
2014 Implant sensor and control
2015 Implantable Fluid Delivery Apparatus and Implantable Electrode (part 4)
2015 Cochlear Implant Electrode Insertion Support Device
2015 Deployable and Multi-Sectional Hearing Implant Electrode
2015 Deployable and Multi-Sectional Hearing Implant Electrode
2016 Implantable Fluid Delivery Apparatus and Implantable Electrode
2016 Implantable fluid delivery apparatus with micro-valve
2017 Implantable fluid delivery apparatus and implantable electrode (part 5)
2017 Implantable Fluid Delivery Apparatus and Implantable Electrode (part 6)
2019 Implantable fluid delivery apparatus and implantable electrode (part 7)
2020 MRI-Safe and Force-Optimized Implantable Ring Magnet System with an Enhanced Inductive Link
2022 MRI-Safe and Force-Optimized Implantable Ring Magnet System with an Enhanced Inductive Link (part 2)

Though she had a number of collaborators, Hochmair contributed to all 36 of these patents in major ways, as the cochlear implant project was hers. As can be seen in the patent timeline above, she has continued to update and improve her device even this year. More than 400,000 people around the world were already using this device as of 2015.

Publications 
Ingeborg Hochmair has over 100 scientific publications in the field of Cochlear Implants, Medical Devices, Neuroprotheses, Audio & Speech Processing Technology. Among the most important ones are the following:

with E. Hochmair: Implantable eight-channel stimulator for the deaf. In: Proc. European Solid State Circuits Conf. (ESSCIRC) 77. Ulm, BRD Sept. 1977, S. 87–89. 
Verfahren zur elektrischen Stimulation des Hörnervs und Multikanal Hörprothese zur Durchführung des Verfahrens, (1978). 
Multifrequency system and method for enhancing auditory stimulation and the like, (1979).
with E. S. Hochmair: Design and fabrication of multi-wire scala tympani electrodes. In: Annals of the New York Academy of Science. Band 405, 1983, S. 173–182.
Technische Realisierung und psychoakustische Evaluation eines Systems zur chronischen Mehrkanalstimulation des Nervus acusticus. Dissertation. TU Vienna, 1981, .
with E. S. Hochmair und K. Burian: Four years of experience with cochlear prostheses (invited). In: Med. Prog. Technol. 8, 1981, S. 107–119.
with E. S. Hochmair und H. K. Stiglbrunner: Psychoacoustic temporal processing and speech understanding in cochlear implant patients. In: R. A. Schindler, M. M. Merzenich: Cochlear Implant. Raven Press, New York, 1985, S. 291–304/. 
with C. Zierhofer und E. S. Hochmair: New hardware for analog and combined-analog-and-pulsatile sound-encoding strategies. In: Progress in Brain Research. Vol. 97, Elsevier Science Publishers, 1993, S. 291–300.
with W. Arnold, P. Nopp, C. Jolly, J. Müller und P. Roland: Deep electrode insertion in Cochlear implants: Apical Morphology, electrodes and speech perception results. In: Acta Otolaryngol. 123 (5), 2003, S. 612–617. 
with P. Nopp und C. Jolly u. a.: MED-EL Cochlear implants: State of the art and a glimpse into the future. In: Trends in Amplification. 10(4), Dez 2006, S. 201–219.
The importance of being flexible. In: Nat Med. 19 (10), Okt 2013, S. 1240–1244.

Awards and honours

 1977      Best Paper Award, European Solid State Circuits Conference, Ulm, BRD  
 1981      Technological Excellence Award, 2nd Place, Tech Ex 81, Vienna - Atlanta  
 1981      Holzer Prize, Technical University of Vienna
 1980      Premio Leonardo da Vinci Award
 1984      Sandoz Prize, Vienna
 1995      Business Woman of the Year Award (Prix Veuve Clicquot)
 1996      Wilhelm Exner Medal
 2004      Honorary Doctorate in Medicine, Technical University of Munich
 2008      Medal of Honour, State of Tyrol
 2010      Honorary Doctorate, Medical University of Innsbruck 
 2011      Cross of Merit, City of Innsbruck
 2012      Honorary Membership of the German Audiological Society (DGA) 
 2013      Honorary Senator of the University of Innsbruck
 2013      Lasker-DeBakey Clinical Medical Research Award, New York, USA 
 2014      Ludwig Wittgenstein Prize, Austrian Research Foundation
 2015      Fritz J. and Dolores H. Russ Prize, US National Academy of Engineering 
 2015      Ring of Honour, State of Tyrol
 2015      Johann Joseph Ritter von Prechtl Medal, Technical University of Vienna  
 2016      Business Advisor, Tyrolean Chamber of Commerce
 2016      Technology Prize, Eduard Rhein Foundation Munich
 2017      Ring of Honour, District of Garbsen 
 2018      Honorary Member of the Austrian Academy of Sciences
 2018      Shambaugh Prize, Corlas 
 2018      Honorary Doctorate, University of Bern 
 2020      Honorary Doctorate, University of Uppsala 
 2021    Honorary Doctorate in Science, University of Innsbruck

Personal life 
Hochmair is married to her husband and business partner, Erwin Hochmair. The couple have four children.

References

External links
https://web.archive.org/web/20130909164247/http://www.laskerfoundation.org/awards/pdf/2013_c_hochmair.pdf archive-date > 09.09.2013
Interview with cochlearimplantonline
laskerfoundation.org
http://idw-online.de/pages/en/news77329?id=77329
https://www.i-med.ac.at/pr/presse/2010/30.html 
http://wirtschaftsblatt.at/archiv/karriere/867516/index
https://web.archive.org/web/20170701212642/http://www.wilhelmexner.at/preistraeger_180.html  
http://www.medel.com
2013 Interview on Charlie Rose

1953 births
Living people
Austrian electrical engineers
Austrian inventors
Scientists from Vienna
TU Wien alumni
Austrian women company founders
Austrian company founders
Women corporate executives
Austrian chief executives
Women chief technology officers
Women inventors
Austrian women engineers
21st-century women engineers
Recipients of the Lasker-DeBakey Clinical Medical Research Award
20th-century women engineers